The 2020 Ykkönen was the 49th season of Ykkönen, the second highest football league in Finland. The season began on 18 April 2020.

New league format
Ykkönen adopted a new league format for the 2020 season. The number of teams was raised from ten to twelve, and promotion series and relegation series will be played after the regular season. Each team will play against each other twice in the regular season. After the regular season the top six teams advanced to the Promotion Series which determines the champion and Veikkausliiga promotion places. The bottom six teams advanced to the relegation series.

The 1st team from the Promotion Series will promote to the Veikkausliiga. The 3rd placed team from the Promotion Series plays against 4th placed team, and the winner of that match plays against 2nd placed team for place in the Veikkausliiga promotion play-offs against 11th placed team from Veikkausliiga. 

The bottom 3 teams from the relegation series will relegate to the Kakkonen.

Overview

A total of twelve teams will contest in the league, including seven sides from the 2019 season, VPS and KPV were relegated from Veikkausliiga and Gnistan, MP and SJK Akatemia who were promoted from Kakkonen after winning the promotion play-offs.

League table

Results

References

Ykkönen seasons
Fin
Fin
2020 in Finnish football leagues